Kōta may refer to:

Kōta, Aichi, a town in Nukata District, Aichi Prefecture, Japan
Kōta (given name), a masculine Japanese given name